Cerithiopsis iudithae is a species of sea snail, a gastropod in the family Cerithiopsidae. It was described by Reitano and Buzzurro in 2006.

References

iudithae
Gastropods described in 2006